Alexander Finney (13 March 1902 – 1982) was an English football player best known for playing for Bolton Wanderers, for whom he made nearly 500 appearances in The Football League. He played for the team in the 1923 and 1929 FA Cup Finals.

References

1902 births
1982 deaths
Association football fullbacks
Bolton Wanderers F.C. players
Darwen F.C. players
English Football League players
English Football League representative players
English footballers
FA Cup Final players
Footballers from St Helens, Merseyside
New Brighton A.F.C. players
South Liverpool F.C. players